Archibald Newcombe Difford (9 April 1883 – 20 September 1918) was a South African first-class cricketer and South African Army officer.

The son of Abraham Difford, he was born at Cape Town in April 1883. He was educated at the Diocesan College, with his obituary describing him as academically gifted. Described by Wisden as "a useful cricketer", Difford made his debut in first-class cricket for Western Province against Eastern Province in the quarter-final of the 1904/05 Currie Cup. He played first-class cricket until the 1911/12 season, making eleven appearances for Western Province, in addition to four for Transvaal and one for The Rest. Playing primarily as a batsman, he scored 842 runs in sixteen first-class matches, making six fifties and one century, a score of 103 against Griqualand West. Alongside cricket, Difford also played rugby.

Difford later married Katrina Wilhelmina van Lier Kuys in June 1913, with the couple having two children. He served in the First World War with the South African Army, being commissioned in January 1917 as a temporary second lieutenant in the 1st Cape Corps. He was killed in action in Ottoman Palestine on 20 September 1918, during the Battle of Nablus. He was buried at the Jerusalem War Cemetery. His brother Ivor and brother-in-law Murray Bisset both played first-class cricket. His name was memorialised by the Gauteng Cricket Board in 2000, with the erection of a Memorial Wall for Transvaal cricketers killed in both world wars.

References

External links

1883 births
1918 deaths
Sportspeople from Cape Town
Alumni of Diocesan College, Cape Town
South African cricketers
Western Province cricketers
Gauteng cricketers
The Rest (South Africa) cricketers
South African Army officers
South African military personnel of World War I
South African military personnel killed in World War I